The 2000 Delaware Fightin' Blue Hens football team represented the University of Delaware as a member of the Atlantic 10 Conference (A-10) during the 2000 NCAA Division I-AA football season. Led by 35th-year head coach Tubby Raymond, the Fightin' Blue Hens compiled an overall record of 12–2 with a mark of 7–1 in conference play, sharing the A-10 title with Richmond. Delaware advanced to the NCAA Division I-AA Football Championship playoffs, where the Fightin' Blue Hens beat  in the first round and Lehigh in the quarterfinals before losing to the eventual national champion, Georgia Southern, in the semifinals. The team played home games at Delaware Stadium in Newark, Delaware.

Schedule

References

Delaware
Delaware Fightin' Blue Hens football seasons
Atlantic 10 Conference football champion seasons
Delaware Fightin' Blue Hens football